Earl Riley (February 18, 1890 – August 17, 1965) was an Oregon politician and businessman, and mayor of Portland, Oregon, United States, from 1941–1949.

He was born Robert Earl Riley on February 18, 1890, in Portland, Oregon, to Harriett Miranda (Richardson) and Lester N. Riley.  His father was a fire bureau captain and his grandfather ran a tannery at Multnomah Stadium (now Providence Park).

School and early career

Riley graduated from the Portland Academy in 1907, attended Oregon State College 1908–1910, and later the Holmes Business College in Portland.  As a second lieutenant he served at the 4th Officers Training School 1918–1919.  He was the superintendent of the Columbia Engine Works machine shop 1919–1931.

Civil Service Commission and City Council

Riley's political career began with appointment in 1928 to Portland's civil service commission, on which he served through 1930.  Two years later, while he was serving as a partner in a tire company, he was named to fill a vacancy on the city council.  He served on the council as commissioner of finance from 1930–1940.

Mayor of Portland

In November 1940, he won his first election to mayor, and was re-elected in 1944.  In 1943, the United States Office of War Information and the British Ministry of Information sent Riley to Europe to tour war-torn cities and boost morale as a "typical American mayor".  Perhaps he was a typical American mayor, but in 1945 Riley was charged by the influential City Club of Portland with negligence in stamping out vice and corruption.  Two years later, the Portland Ministerial Alliance repeated the charges.  According to historian E. Kimbark MacColl, Riley had a secret vault in his City Hall office to store his percentage of vice protection payments.  In the book Vanishing Portland, the Bottenbergs reported that the Portland police were collecting $60,000 a month in protection payments from gambling and prostitution operations, with much of this money going to Riley.  Despite denials of laxness in his administration, Riley lost his third mayoral campaign to the reformer Dorothy McCullough Lee.

After the war, Portland Mayor Earl Riley openly declared the city could absorb only a minimum of Negros without upsetting its regular life.

In its 1965 obituary of Riley, The Oregonian called him "a tough, able and demanding administrator and a wizard at municipal financing".  Commissioner William A. Bowes described him as a man willing to work 18 and 20 hours a day.

Later career

After his mayoral loss, Riley told his friends he was through with politics.  He acquired a Packard automobile dealership.  The business failed when the car ceased production, and he became a car salesman for a competitor, Barnard Motors.  He was an active civic leader, with an interest in the Shriner's Hospital for Crippled Children and the Easter Seals campaigns.  He retired from business in 1959 after suffering a serious heart attack.

Personal information

Riley was known as a flashy cigar-chewing man.  He is described in his draft records as brown-haired and blue-eyed.  He met his future wife, E. Fay Wade, while the two were attending Oregon State College, and they married on March 25, 1920.

Besides the Shriner's he also belonged to the American Legion, Moose International, Fraternal Order of Eagles, Rotary International, Woodmen of the World, Royal Order of Jesters, Phi Delta Theta, Neighbors of Woodcraft, the Multnomah Athletic Club, and was a 33rd Degree Freemason.  He was also a Baptist.

Riley died at the age of 75 of a heart attack at his home on August 17, 1965.  He is buried at Portland’s Lone Fir Cemetery.  After her husband's death, Fay Riley moved to Richardson, Texas, to be with her daughter, Dorislee and son-in-law Rieves Hoffpauer.  She died in Dallas, Texas, on July 25, 1968, and is buried at Lone Fir Cemetery, next to her husband.

References

 Bottenberg, Ray and Jeanna.  Vanishing Portland.  Charleston, SC: Arcadia Publishing, 2008.
"Earl Riley Served City" (obituary), The Oregonian, August 18, 1965, p. 10.
"Mrs. E. Fay Riley" (obituary), The Oregonian, July 25, 1968, p. 22.
"War Mayor Earl Riley Dies from Heart Attack". The Oregonian, August 18, 1965, p. 1.
 Who Was Who in American History, volume 4, 1961–1968.  Chicago: Marquis Who’s Who, 1968.

1890 births
1965 deaths
Portland City Council members (Oregon)
Mayors of Portland, Oregon
Oregon Republicans
20th-century American politicians
Politicians from Portland, Oregon
Burials at Lone Fir Cemetery